Evangelos Papastratos (1910 – 1998) was a Greek businessman born in the city of Agrinio in Aetolia-Acarnania, Greece.

Although the youngest of his brothers, he was the first in his family to become involved with the tobacco trade. Along with his brother Sotirios he founded the Papastratiou Brothers firm, one of the biggest tobacco companies in Greece until the rise in foreign cigarette imports in the 1970s and the 1980s. Papastratos also wrote a book called I douleia kai o kopos tis (Η δουλειά και ο κόπος της).

External links
Evangelos Papastratos on Nea Epohi

1910 births
1973 deaths
20th-century Greek businesspeople
Greek philanthropists
People from Agrinio
20th-century philanthropists